The Osage River is a  tributary of the Missouri River in central Missouri in the United States. The watershed includes an area of east-central Kansas and a large portion of west-central and central Missouri, where it drains northwest areas of the Ozark Plateau.

The river flows generally easterly, then northeasterly for the final  where it joins the Missouri River. It is impounded in two major locations. Most of the river has been converted into a chain of two reservoirs, the Harry S. Truman Reservoir and the Lake of the Ozarks.

Description
The lake receives the South Grand River as a second arm of the reservoir from the northwest, as well as the Pomme de Terre River from the south. The two arms of the reservoir join near the Harry S. Truman Dam in central Benton County.

Constructed in 1931, the dam collects the Niangua River.

History

The river is named for the Osage Nation, the historic indigenous people who dominated this region at the time when the first European settlers arrived. The river presented significant navigation difficulties for early settlers because of its fluctuating water levels, as well as the presence of shallow pools and sand bars caused by its tight meandering course through the hills.

The Missouri Legislature attempted as early as 1839 to deepen the channel of the river.  Early attempts failed because of lack of funding for the immense task.  Commercial navigation on the river in the 19th century was confined mostly to smaller craft that could navigate the tight bends and shoals of the river.  Improvements in the channel by the last two decades of the century led to greater commercial traffic. These changes made the lower reaches of the river navigable for steamboat commerce for a period of six to nine months out of the year.

In the 20th century, federal construction of the Bagnell Dam, primarily to generate hydroelectricity, began in 1922 and was completed after nine years. It effectively ended commercial navigation on the river.  The Truman Dam was authorized by the federal Flood Control Act of 1954 and was completed in 1979.

The two dams on the river generate power for the St. Louis metropolitan area. The large reservoirs have become popular tourist destinations and recreation areas in the region.

See also
List of Kansas rivers
 List of Missouri rivers

References

External links
 "Navigating the Osage River in Missouri: 1839-1926", hosted by Miller County Museum

Rivers of Missouri
Tributaries of the Missouri River
Bodies of water of the Ozarks
Rivers of Bates County, Missouri
Rivers of Benton County, Missouri
Rivers of Camden County, Missouri
Rivers of Cole County, Missouri
Rivers of Henry County, Missouri
Rivers of Miller County, Missouri
Rivers of Morgan County, Missouri
Rivers of Osage County, Missouri
Rivers of St. Clair County, Missouri
Rivers of Vernon County, Missouri